The Basketball tournament of the 2009 Lusophony Games was played in Lisbon, Portugal. The venue was the Complexo dos Desportos de Almada. The tournament was played from 11  to 19 July 2009, and there are both men's and women's competition.

Male Competition

Preliminary

Group A

Group B

7th place

5th place

Knockout stage

Male Basketball medal table by country

Female Competition

Round Robin

Female Basketball medal table by country

See also
ACOLOP
Lusophony Games
2009 Lusophony Games

Basketball at the Lusofonia Games
Basketball
2009 in basketball
2009–10 in Portuguese basketball
International basketball competitions hosted by Portugal